Nils Lindberg (11 June 1933 – 20 February 2022) was a Swedish composer and pianist.

Biography
Lindberg was born in Uppsala on 11 June 1933. He was known both as a jazz composer and musician, but was also active in other styles. Several of his works are written in a style combining elements of jazz, Swedish folk music and classical music.

He studied musicology at Uppsala University from 1952 to 1956 and then composition at the Royal College of Music, Stockholm, from 1956 to 1960. "While still a student he began playing professionally with" Benny Bailey (1957–8), Anders Burman (1958), Ove Lind (1959), Lars Gullin, and Putte Wickman. He played with a touring Duke Ellington in 1973 and recorded with vocalist Karin Krog in 1976.

Lindberg died on 20 February 2022, at the age of 88.

Discography

As arranger
Swedish Folk Tunes from Dalecarlia - Andrew Canning, church organ, Uppsala Cathedral Choir, Milke Falck Proprius, PRSACD 2032 (2004)
Timeless - Dalecarlian Paintings - Jan Allan, trumpet, Putte Wickman, clarinet, Arne Domnérus, alto saxophone, Bjarne Nerem, tenor saxophone, Anders Lindskog, tenor saxophone, Erik Nilsson, baritone saxophone, Torgny Nilsson, trombone, Jan Allan, trumpet, alto horn, Nils Lindberg, piano, organ, conductor, Björn Alke, bass, Sture Nordin, bass, Roman Dylag, bass, Fredrik Norén, drums, Nils-Erik Slörner, drums, The Fresk Quartet, Sockentrio from Rattvik, Swedish Radio Orchestra Prophone, PCD 081 (2005)
Speglingar - Mytologiska bilder Anders Paulson, soprano saxophone, Dalasinfoniettan, Bjarne Engeset Swedish Society Discofil, SCD 1140 (2008)

Source:

Bibliography
As You are, Music Memories (2006), Swedish, 168 pages, Stockholm: Svenskt visarkiv, Jazz Department at The Centre for Swedish Folk Music and Jazz Research, 0281-5567 ; 17

References

External links
Composer's website, accessed 8 February 2010
Gehrmans Musikförlag biographical page, accessed 8 February 2010
 
 

1933 births
2022 deaths
20th-century Swedish male musicians
20th-century Swedish musicians
Big band bandleaders
Jazz bandleaders
Swedish composers
Swedish male composers
Swedish jazz musicians
Royal College of Music, Stockholm alumni
Musicians from Uppsala
Male jazz musicians